Typhoon Kathy, known in the Philippines as Typhoon Welpring, was the largest and longest-lived typhoon in 1964. As the fourteenth named storm of the season, it originated from an area of circulation southeast of Japan by August 11. The following day, the system strengthened into a tropical storm, gaining the name Kathy. Kathy reached typhoon strength on August 13, passing south of Tokyo, approaching the Ryukyu Islands. Between August 15 and August 16, Kathy weakened into a tropical storm, before strengthening back to typhoon status. The storm's west-southwest path brought the center across the Ryukyu Islands and near Okinawa on August 16 as Kathy began to execute a loop in its track. The typhoon's track made a smaller loop on August 20, before heading northwards. It then curved northeast.  On August 25, Kathy transitioned into an extratropical cyclone and continued northeast, reaching the Bering Strait on September 1.

Meteorological history 

The interaction of a polar trough and easterly wave led to the genesis of an area of circulation southeast of Japan by August 11. This system developed into a tropical storm, gaining the name Kathy the following day east of Iwo Jima based on ship observations. Maintaining a west-northwestward heading, Kathy reached typhoon strength on August 13, passing well south of Tokyo on approach towards the Ryukyu Islands. For the next four days, Kathy and nearby Typhoon Marie began a Fujiwhara interaction, causing both storms to rotate around one another, ending when Marie was absorbed into Kathy's circulation. Between August 15–16, Kathy briefly fell to tropical storm intensity before regaining typhoon status southeast of Amami Ōshima. During this period, an airplane investigating the storm identified multiple wind circulations at the center of Kathy and the storm's clouds were asymmetric. The storm's west-southwest path brought the center across the Ryukyu Islands and near Okinawa on August 16 as Kathy began to execute a counterclockwise loop in its track. Two days later, Kathy's winds were estimated by the JTWC to be around  near Minamidaitōjima. The typhoon's track made a smaller counterclockwise loop on August 20 before resuming north across the northern Ryukyu Islands. It then curved to the northeast, briefly entering the Sea of Japan and crossing the Noto Peninsula before traversing northern Honshu and emerging into the northern Pacific. On August 25, Kathy transitioned into an extratropical cyclone and continued northeast towards the Aleutian Islands before it was last in the Bering Strait on September 1.

Preparations and impact 
United Press International reported as many as 24 fatalities and 8 missing persons associated with the typhoon, with the Associated Press documenting 28 injuries. Over 4,000 people were rendered homeless. Kathy's effects flooded almost 1,700 homes and destroyed 8 others in Amami Ōshima; winds there reached . As Kathy moved across southern and central Kyushu, damage was reported in Kagoshima, Kumamoto, Miyazaki, and Oita prefectures. Kathy's winds razed 44 houses and damaged 80 houses, with another 5,500 flooded by swollen rivers. Flooding broke through river embankments in 37 locations and washed away 18 bridges. Telecommunications and transportation services were disrupted with roads damaged in 400 locations. There were at least 238 landslides caused by the typhoon, including one that derailed a passenger train in Oita Prefecture. One landslide in Kagoshima killed 11 people. Two thousand homes were flooded farther north in Fukushima Prefecture. The extratropical remnants of Kathy brought gale-force winds over the Bering Sea.

See also 

Typhoon Kent (1992) – an intense typhoon that took a comparable track.
Typhoon Rusa (2002) – the most powerful typhoon to strike South Korea in 43 years and took a nearly identical track.
Typhoon Halola (2015) – a category 2 equivalent typhoon that affected similar areas.
 Typhoon Noru (2017) – a powerful typhoon that was the second-longest-lasting tropical cyclone of the Northwest Pacific Ocean on record and took a similar track.
 Typhoon Hinnamnor (2022) – a very large and strong tropical cyclone that took nearly identical track.

References 

1964 in Japan
1964 Pacific typhoon season
August 1964 events in Asia
Typhoons in Japan